NMIC may refer to:

National Maritime Intelligence Center
National Minerals Information Center
Network Monitoring Interface Card
Not Made In China